Pleasant Run is a census-designated place (CDP) in Hamilton County, Ohio, United States. The population was 4,861 at the 2020 census.

History
Pleasant Run takes its name from a stream. Pleasant Run was described in the 1940 American Guide Series as a rural village with 39 inhabitants.

Geography
Pleasant Run is located at  (39.290557, -84.567860).

According to the United States Census Bureau, the CDP has a total area of 2.1 square miles (5.4 km), all land.

Demographics

At the 2000 census there were 5,267 people, 1,778 households, and 1,477 families living in the CDP. The population density was 2,541.6 people per square mile (982.4/km). There were 1,791 housing units at an average density of 864.3/sq mi (334.1/km).  The racial makeup of the CDP was 88.65% White, 7.69% African American, 0.40% Native American, 1.92% Asian, 0.04% Pacific Islander, 0.23% from other races, and 1.08% from two or more races. Hispanic or Latino of any race were 1.16%.

Of the 1,778 households 42.4% had children under the age of 18 living with them, 69.0% were married couples living together, 10.0% had a female householder with no husband present, and 16.9% were non-families. 15.1% of households were one person and 4.2% were one person aged 65 or older. The average household size was 2.95 and the average family size was 3.26.

The age distribution was 29.3% under the age of 18, 7.7% from 18 to 24, 32.0% from 25 to 44, 24.0% from 45 to 64, and 7.0% 65 or older. The median age was 34 years. For every 100 females, there were 97.6 males. For every 100 females age 18 and over, there were 92.6 males.

The median household income was $57,065 and the median family income  was $60,305. Males had a median income of $37,973 versus $30,432 for females. The per capita income for the CDP was $20,307. About 1.7% of families and 3.0% of the population were below the poverty line, including 2.5% of those under age 18 and none of those age 65 or over.

References

Census-designated places in Hamilton County, Ohio
Census-designated places in Ohio